Plica caribeana, the Caribbean treerunner, is a species of South American lizard in the family Tropiduridae. The species is found in Venezuela, Trinidad and the Bocas Islands.

References

Plica
Lizards of South America
Reptiles of Venezuela
Reptiles described in 2013